The X17 particle is a hypothetical subatomic particle proposed by Attila Krasznahorkay and his colleagues to explain certain anomalous measurement results. The particle has been proposed to explain wide angles observed in the trajectory paths of particles produced during a nuclear transition of beryllium-8 atoms and in stable helium atoms. The X17 particle could be the force carrier for a postulated fifth force, possibly connected with dark matter, and has been described as a protophobic (i.e., ignoring protons) vector boson with a mass near . 

The NA64 experiment at CERN looks for the proposed X17 particle by striking the electron beams from the Super Proton Synchrotron on fixed target nuclei.

History
In an effort to find a dark photon, the team fired protons at thin targets of lithium-7, which created unstable beryllium-8 nuclei that then decayed and produced pairs of electrons and positrons. This indicated that a small fraction of beryllium-8 might shed its excess energy in the form of a new particle. The result was successfully repeated by the team.

Feng et al. The force may explain the  − 2 muon anomaly and provide a dark matter candidate. , several research experiments are underway to attempt to validate or refute these results.

Krasznahorkay (2019) posted a preprint announcing that he and his team at ATOMKI had successfully observed the same anomalies in the decay of stable helium atoms as had been observed in beryllium-8, strengthening the case for the existence of the X17 particle.

This was covered in science journalism, focusing largely on the implications that the existence of the X17 particle and a corresponding fifth force would have in the search for dark matter.

Skepticism
, the ATOMKI paper describing the particle has not been peer reviewed and should therefore be considered preliminary. In late 2019, a follow-up paper was published in Acta Physica Polonica B. Efforts by CERN and other groups to independently detect the particle have been unsuccessful so far.

The ATOMKI group had claimed to find various other new particles earlier in 2016 but abandoned these claims later, without an explanation of what caused the spurious signals. The group has also been accused of cherry-picking results that support new particles while discarding null results.

The X‑17 particle is not consistent with the Standard Model, so its existence would need to be explained by another theory.

See also
 Axion
 List of particles
 750 GeV diphoton excess

References

Bosons
Dark matter
Hypothetical elementary particles
Force carriers